This list of islands by area includes all islands in the world larger than  and most of the islands over , sorted in descending order by area. For comparison, four very large continental landmasses are also shown.

Continental landmasses
Continental landmasses are not usually classified as islands despite being completely surrounded by water. However, because the definition of continent varies between geographers, the Americas are sometimes defined as two separate continents while mainland Australia is sometimes defined as an island as well as a continent. Nevertheless, for the purposes of this list, mainland Australia along with the other major landmasses have been listed as continental landmasses for comparison. The figures are approximations and are for the four major continental landmasses only. The artificial Panama and Suez canals are disregarded, as they are not natural waters that separate the continents.

Islands

Islands  and greater

Islands

Islands

Islands

Islands

Islands 
The area of some Antarctic islands is uncertain.

See also 

 Lake island
 List of Antarctic and subantarctic islands
 List of countries and dependencies by area
 List of countries by largest island
 List of divided islands
 List of islands by highest point
 List of islands by name
 List of islands by population
 List of islands by population density
 Lists of islands by continent and country
 Recursive islands and lakes
 River island

Notes

References

Citations

External links 
 Global Island Network – Island Links Directory

Islands